Tagetes subulata is an herbaceous plant of the family Asteraceae. It is widespread across most of Mexico, and found also in Central America, Colombia, and Venezuela. It has highly divided bright green leaves and yellow flowers contained in an elongated calyx.

References

subulata
Flora of Mexico
Flora of Central America
Flora of South America
Plants described in 1824